This article shows the statistics of FC Porto in the competitions and matches played during the 1999–2000 season.

Season summary
FC Porto reached the UEFA Champions League quarter-final.

Kit
Porto's kit was manufactured by Italian kit manufacturer Kappa and sponsored by Portuguese ceramics producer Revigrés.

First team squad

Results

Supertaça Cândido de Oliveira

Primeira Liga

League table

Taça de Portugal

Knockout stage

Final

UEFA Champions League

First group stage

Second group stage

Knockout stage 

Quarter-finals

References

FC Porto seasons
Porto